Boeing 702 is a communication satellite bus family designed and manufactured by the Boeing Satellite Development Center, and flown from the late-1990s into the 2020s.

The baseline Boeing 702 is compatible with several orbital launch systems, including Atlas V, Ariane 5, Delta IV, Falcon 9, Proton, and the Sea Launch-operated Zenit 3SL.

Platform versions
After the introduction of the original 702 in 1997, the platform has been continually updated. New members of the platform have been introduced through the years, which allowed the common systems and approaches to span the whole range of mass and power for geosynchronous orbit satellites. The family currently spans four different members: the 702HP for high-power applications, the 702HP-GEO for mobile-telephone services, the 702MP for medium-power requirements and the 702SP for small satellites.

702HP 

The high-power 702 platform was originally announced in October 1998. With the 2009 introduction of the 702MP "mid-power version", the legacy Boeing 702 platform, which had been continuously evolved, was designated the Boeing 702HP for "high-power". According to Moog-ISP, the 702HP platform uses its bipropellant thrusters.

The SES-9, a 702HP model, launched aboard the Falcon 9 Flight 22 on 4 March 2016.

702 GEO-Mobile 
Developed in 1997 for their launch customer Thuraya, it is a special version of the 702HP platform with a 12.25-meter deployable antenna, onboard digital signal processing and beamforming. It is a specialized platform for direct service of mobile users.

702MP 
In 2009 Boeing introduced the 702MP platform, a mid-power solution based on the high-power 702HP platform. The 702MP provides the high-capability features inherent in the flight-proven Boeing 702HP satellite model, but with a substantially updated satellite bus structure and simplified propulsion system. The 702MP was designed for satellites in the middle-level power ranges, supporting payloads ranging from 6 to 12 kilowatts. According to Moog-ISP, the 702MP platform uses both its bipropellant thrusters and LEROS liquid apogee engine.

Intelsat is the lead customer for the 702MP. Boeing built Intelsat 21, Intelsat 22, Intelsat 27 and Intelsat 29e (the first EpicNG) satellites based on the platform.
In May 2013, Intelsat ordered an additional four EpicNG satellites from Boeing. The first of this new order will be Intelsat 33e.
In July 2014, Boeing announced the order of a ninth Intelsat 702MP order, the EpicNG Intelsat 35e.

On January 15, 2015, the SatNews Publishers disclosed Boeing's second 702MP customer. New York Broadband LLC would order an L-band satellite Silkwave 1 to be fully leased to CMMB Vision of Hong Kong. The satellite is expected to enter service in 2018 in the 105° east orbital slot to replace AsiaStar.

702SP 

By 2005, Boeing was offering a Xenon Electrostatic ion thruster System (XIPS) option for the 702 satellite system.  XIPS is 10 times more efficient than conventional liquid-fuel systems. On a XIPS equipped 702 satellite, four  thrusters provide economical station keeping, needing only  of fuel per year, "a fraction of what bipropellant or arcjet systems consume". An XIPS-equipped satellite can be used for final orbit insertion, conserving even more payload mass, as compared to using a traditional on-board liquid apogee engine.

Beginning in 2012, Boeing began manifesting all-electric propulsion commsats on the 702SP XIPS propulsion bus for eventual location in geosynchronous orbit.  These satellites were the first to be launched with the intent to fully position the satellites using electric propulsion, thus requiring 4–6 months following launch to ready the satellite for its communication mission, but at substantial reduction in launch mass and, therefore, launch cost.

, Boeing had sold four of the 702SP satellites to Asia Broadcast Satellite (ABS) of Hong Kong and Mexico's SatMex, with the first two commsats planned for a paired launch in early 2015.

In November 2014, Boeing released information that two of the 702SP satellites they have built—ABS-3A and Eutelsat 115 West B—had completed manufacture and had been stacked conjoined as they prepared for a launch on a SpaceX Falcon 9 vehicle in early 2015.  This was to be Boeing's first conjoined launch of two commsats. The two commsats were launched aboard a SpaceX rocket from Cape Canaveral, Florida, at 3:50AM UTC on 2 March 2015 (10:50PM EST on 1 March 2015).

In February 2014, SES announced that it had ordered a Boeing 702SP-based sat for SES-15.

In March 2014, Boeing disclosed an early-2013 order by an unnamed U.S. government agency for three 702SP spacecraft.

In June 2015, Asia Broadcast Satellite (ABS) ordered an additional 702SP, ABS-8, planned to be launched by late 2017, in part because they were well satisfied with performance of ABS-3A, even before it reached its operative orbit.  When launched on a Falcon 9, the total investment for ABS was sufficiently low that it would be acceptable even if another satellite to pair on the launch was not added.
ABS later cancelled the order after failing to successfully finance the project, in part related to changes to the mechanisms of the Ex-Im Bank during 2015.  , Boeing and ABS considering other business agreement options.

Customers

Orders and launches

References

External links 
 Boeing 702SP dual-stack integration and test, Boeing, December 2014.

Satellite buses
Boeing 702
Communications satellites